The 2023 Pathum Thani Six-red World Championship was a non-ranking six-red snooker tournament held from 6 to 11 March 2023 at the Thammasat University Convention Centre in Pathum Thani, Thailand. The event was originally scheduled for September 2022, but was postponed until March 2023. A qualification round was played prior to the tournament with four players qualifying to the 32 player field.

Stephen Maguire was the defending champion, having won the previous championship in September 2019, but he was eliminated in the group stage. Ding Junhui won the event for the second time, beating Thepchaiya Un-Nooh 8–6 in the final.

Prize fund
A breakdown of the prize money awarded is shown below.
Winner = £100,800
Runner-up = £31,200
Semi-final = £18,000
Quarter-final = £9,000
Last 16 = £3,600

Results

Group stage 
Source:

Group A 

 Ding Junhui 5–2 Stephen Maguire
 Zhang Anda  5–2 Mink Nutcharut
 Zhang Anda  5–2 Stephen Maguire
 Ding Junhui 5–2 Mink Nutcharut
 Zhang Anda  5–0 Ding Junhui
 Stephen Maguire 5–0 Mink Nutcharut

Group B 

 Thepchaiya Un-Nooh 5–0 Jimmy White
 Tom Ford 5–1 Zhou Yuelong
 Zhou Yuelong 5–1 Jimmy White
 Thepchaiya Un-Nooh 5–3 Tom Ford
 Thepchaiya Un-Nooh 5–2 Zhou Yuelong
 Jimmy White 5–3 Tom Ford

Group C 

 John Higgins 5–2 Ken Doherty
 Hossein Vafaei 5–2 Poramin Danjirakul
 Hossein Vafaei 5–1 John Higgins
 Pormin Danjirakul 5–3 Ken Doherty
 John Higgins 5–0 Poramin Danjirakul
 Hossein Vafaei 5–1 Ken Doherty

Group D 

 Judd Trump 5–0 Ricky Walden
 Ma Hai Long 5–3 Kritsanut Lertsattayathorn
 Judd Trump 5–4 Kritsanut Lertsattayathorn
 Ricky Walden 5–1 Ma Hailong
 Judd Trump 5–4 Ma Hailong
 Ricky Walden 5–4 Kritsanut Lertsattayathorn

Group E 

 Robert Milkins 5–2 Matthew Selt
 Chris Wakelin 5–4 Dechawat Poomjaeng
 Chris Wakelin 5–4 Matthew Selt
 Dechawat Poomjaeng 5–0 Robert Milkins
 Chris Wakelin 5–3 Robert Milkins
 Matthew Selt 5–3 Dechawat Poomjaeng

Group F 

 Joe Perry 5–1 Mark Williams 
 Andres Petrov  5–3 Sunny Akani
 Mark Williams 5–4 Sunny Akani
 Joe Perry 5–3 Andres Petrov
 Mark Williams 5–2 Andres Petrov
 Joe Perry 5–3 Sunny Akani

Group G 

 Noppon Saengkham 5–4 Jordan Brown 
 Stuart Bingham  5–1 Mahoud El Hareedy
 Stuart Bingham 5–2 Jordan Brown
 Noppon Saengkham 5–1 Mahoud El Hareedy
 Jordan Brown 5–2 Mahoud El Hareedy
 Stuart Bingham 5–1 Noppon Saengkham

Group H 

 Ronnie O'Sullivan 5–3 Jimmy Robertson 
 James Wattana  5–1 Stan Moody
 Ronnie O'Sullivan 5–2 Stan Moody
 James Wattana  5–4 Jimmy Robertson
 Jimmy Robertson 5–2 Stan Moody
 Ronnie O'Sullivan 5–2 James Wattana

Knockout stage 
Source:

Final

Qualifying 
Qualifying for the event took place from 7 to 9 January 2023 at the Metrodome in Barnsley, England. Four players qualified for the final stage in Thailand, one from each quarter of the draw. Eight players received byes to Round 2. Ricky Walden later got an automatic place in the main event draw as a top 16 player pulled out.

First quarter

Second quarter

Third quarter

Fourth quarter

Maximum breaks
(Note: A maximum break in six-red is 75)

Main stage
 Matthew Selt (80)

Qualifying stage
 Andy Lee
 Jackson Page
 Peng Yisong
 Zhou Yuelong

References

2023
2023 in snooker
2023 in Thai sport
March 2023 sports events in Thailand